Jaco Island (Fataluku:  or ) is an uninhabited island in East Timor, a country occupying the eastern end of the island of Timor in the Lesser Sunda Islands in Southeast Asia. It lies within the Nino Konis Santana National Park.

Overview

Jaco Island lies just off the eastern end of the island of Timor, part of the Tutuala subdistrict in Lautém District, and is separated from the mainland in front of Valu Beach by a  channel or strait (known as Jaco Strait) navigable by small vessels.

The island, the beach and the channel are sometimes said to be the points where Timor meets the boundary between the Banda Sea (including Wetar Strait) to the north and Timor Sea to the south. According to the standard work Limits of Oceans and Seas, 3rd edition (1953), published by the International Hydrographic Organization (IHO), however, the only point where Timor meets those two seas is Tanjong Sewirawa (now known as Cape Cutcha), the eastern extremity of the Timorese mainland. Cape Cutcha is a short distance northwest of the island, and north of the beach.

It is covered mainly by tropical dry forest, fringed by strand vegetation and sandy beaches. There are some low cliffs on the southern coast.

Climate

On average the island receives  of rain and the north and east coast of the small island is somewhat drier.

Wildlife
The island supports populations of bar-necked cuckoo-doves, black cuckoo-doves, pink-headed imperial pigeons, streak-breasted honeyeaters, fawn-breasted whistlers, blue-cheeked flowerpeckers, flame-breasted sunbirds and Timor sparrows.

The Javan rusa native deer can also be found on the island and unlike mainland deer, they have become accustomed to drinking salt water due to the lack of freshwater on the island.

Jaco is listed by BirdLife International as an Important Bird Area.

See also
 Geography of East Timor
 List of Important Bird Areas in East Timor
 List of islands of East Timor

References

External links

Islands of East Timor
National parks of East Timor
Uninhabited islands
Lautém Municipality
Important Bird Areas of East Timor